The Indian flying frog (Pterorana khare) is a species of frog in the family Ranidae. It is the only species in the monotypic genus Pterorana. It is found in India and Myanmar but extirpated in Nepal. Its natural habitats are subtropical or tropical moist lowland forests, subtropical or tropical moist montane forests, and rivers. The species was discovered by M.Khare and Kiyasetuo in 1986.

References

True frogs
Amphibians of Myanmar
Frogs of India
Monotypic amphibian genera
Amphibians described in 1986
Taxonomy articles created by Polbot